Maria Angelica Rosedell Malbas Amante-Matba (born April 16, 1970), is a Filipino registered nurse and politician currently serving as the governor of Agusan del Norte, a position she previously held from 1995 to 2004 and from 2013 to 2019. She was also a member of the House of Representatives of the Philippines representing Agusan del Norte's 2nd congressional district.

Early life and education
Amante-Matba was born and raised in Cabadbaran, Agusan del Norte. She is the daughter of former Executive Secretary and Congressman Edelmiro Amante and former Cabadbaran Mayor Rosario Malbas-Amante. Her brother Erlpe John Amante is also a politician.

She took up nursing at St. Luke's College of Nursing, Trinity University of Asia in 1991. She passed the licensure examination for nursing in 1991 and the California State Board Exam in Nursing in 1994. She also holds a masters degree in public administration from Father Saturnino Urios University in Butuan.

Political career

Amante-Matba started her political career as the governor of Agusan del Norte serving three consecutive terms from 1995 to 2004. At the time, she was the youngest provincial governor assuming office at only 25 years old. From 1995 to 1998, she was the chairperson of the Regional Development Council of Caraga. From 1998 to 2001, she was elected as the secretary of the Confederation of Provincial Governors, City Mayors and Municipal Mayors League Presidents of Mindanao of the Mindanao Economic Development Council (MEDCO).

Due to constitutional provisions that limit gubernatorial terms of office to only three consecutive terms, in the 2004 elections, Amante-Matba ran for congress and won a seat in the House of Representatives representing Agusan del Norte's 2nd congressional district. She served for one term before running as mayor of Butuan in 2007 which she lost to incumbent Democrito Plaza.

In 2010, she ran for congress again while her brother ran for governor. They both won their respective races. In 2013 and 2016, Amante-Matba and her brother swapped their positions wherein the latter served as congressman while Amante-Matba served governor. They won and Amante-Matba served as governor until 2019. She ran and won again the congressional seat in 2019 and served for one term before returning as governor in 2022.

2016 presidential elections
Amante is a close ally of President Rodrigo Duterte. She was once quoted by President Duterte as the girl who he has love at first sight. President Rodrigo Duterte admitted publicly that a governor from Mindanao whom he once fell in love with was one of his supporters during the campaign.

Personal life
Amante is married to Tawi-tawi congressman Rashidin H. Matba.

On March 27, 2015, she survived an ambush attempt at Nasipit, Agusan del Norte perpetrated by members of the New People's Army.

Related Links

References

Filipino nurses
People from Agusan del Norte
People from Butuan
Governors of Agusan del Norte
Women members of the House of Representatives of the Philippines
1970 births
PDP–Laban politicians
Members of the House of Representatives of the Philippines from Agusan del Norte
Politicians from Agusan del Norte
Living people